Pietro Gaetani (died 1500) was a Roman Catholic prelate who served as Bishop of Fondi (1476–1500).

On 31 May 1476, Pietro Gaetani was appointed during the papacy of Pope Sixtus IV as Bishop of Fondi.
He served as Bishop of Fondi until his death in 1500.

References 

15th-century Italian Roman Catholic bishops
16th-century Italian Roman Catholic bishops
Bishops appointed by Pope Sixtus IV
1500 deaths